Peravurani is a state assembly constituency in Tamil Nadu. Peravurani constituency created on the year of 1967 on delimitation of Pattukkottai Assembly constituency. It elects a member to the Tamil Nadu Legislative Assembly once every five years. From the 1967 elections, Anna Dravida Munnetra Kazhagam won the assembly seat three times (in 1984, 2006, 2016 state elections), Dravida Munnetra Kazhagam won the assembly seat three times (in 1967, 1977 and 1980, 2021), Tamil Maanila Congress (Moopanar) won two times by 1996 and 2001 elections and Indian National Congress two times won the seat (in 1989 and 1991) and Desiya Murpokku Dravidar Kazhagam won the seat in 2011 election. The current member of legislative assembly N. Ashok Kumar from Dravida Munnetra Kazhagam. It is one of the 234 State Legislative Assembly Constituencies in Tamil Nadu, in India.

Notable candidatures 
Seruvai.pa.Malaiyappan who belongs to AIADMK Party, has led the party in peravurani in its early stages; he led the party front as union secretary (AIADMK), He had won as Union Chairman when votes are elected directly by people and become District council member twice, when he is all set to become MLA candidate he died due to cardiac arrest in 2002.
 Kuzha. Chellaiya is an Indian politician and a Member of the Legislative Assembly of Tamil Nadu who born and brought up in Mudhukadu Village of Peravurani Taluk; who worked in both major political parties of Tamil Nadu, Dravida Munnetra Kazhagam and Anna Dravida Munnetra Kazhagam in different times. He was elected to the Tamil Nadu legislative assembly as an Independent candidate from Peravurani Assembly constituency in the 1971 state assembly elections. He is the only Independent candidate, elected as a Member of legislative assembly from Peravurani assembly constituency.

Elected members
The first election in Peravurani Assembly constituency conducted in the year of 1967. The First Member of legislative assembly from Peravurani constituency is M.K. Krishnamoorthy from Dravida Munnetra Kazhagam.

Election results

2021

2016

2011

2006

2001

1996

1991

1989

1984

1980

1977

1971

1967

References 

 

Assembly constituencies of Tamil Nadu